The second siege of Zaragoza was the French capture of the Spanish city of Zaragoza (also known as Saragossa) during the Peninsular War. It was particularly noted for its brutality. The city was heavily outnumbered against the French. However, the desperate resistance put up by the Army of Reserve and its civilian allies had been heroic: a great part of the city lay in ruins, the garrison had suffered 24,000 deaths being augmented by 30,000 civilians dead.

Background
The Spanish campaign in early 1809 started with the Battle of Uclés.

Historical context
As a part of the Dos de Mayo (2 May) uprising the city had already successfully resisted a first siege from 15 June 1808 to 14 August 1808. This was one of the first times in history that a regular army was defeated by irregulars in street fighting.

Further defeats – especially the surrender of General Dupont at the Battle of Bailén – forced King Joseph Bonaparte to withdraw behind the Ebro River, abandoning most of Spain except a small corner in the north-east and a small area around Barcelona.

The Spanish at this point missed their best chance to defeat the French. They did not appoint a Supreme Commander, so all the armies continued to operate independently. The main armies consisted of those of General Blake on the north coast, General Castaños around Tudela and General Palafox around Saragossa. Blake was the most active, but he was defeated at Zornoza on 31 October 1808.

Napoleon's plan was to attack in strength towards Burgos in between the armies of Blake and Castaños. Once they broke through they were to swing both north and south to envelope the remaining armies. In order to achieve this, Napoleon wanted the exposed Spanish armies to remain in their current advanced positions. To achieve this Marshal Moncey's 3rd Corps opposite General Castaños remained inactive from late October to 21 November while Ney's 4th Corps tried to get to his rear through Burgos and Soria.

On 21 November 1808, the French 3rd Corps crossed the Ebro River at Logrono and headed east towards Calahorra. Marshal Ney's column reached the Upper Douro valley and headed for Tudela.

To avoid being trapped, Castaños withdrew to Tudela and asked Palafox to help him hold a line running South of the city towards Cascante, where he intended to confront Moncey's Corps before the arrival of Ney's 4th Corps. Palafox's deputy in the area, general O'Neylle demurred stating that he had strict orders not to cross the borders of Aragon (Tudela is located in Navarre).

When Palafox's approval arrived, the French attack had already begun and got the Spanish in disarray. This battle was a major victory for the French, but the Spanish armies were able to flee, O'Neylle to Saragossa and Castaños to Madrid, escaping with the large majority of their war chests and cannons. The stage was now set for a second siege.

The defences
Considerable changes occurred in the defences of Saragossa after the first siege in June–August. In that siege, the city had few fortifications, except for the medieval walls that could not withstand the French artillery bombardment. The defenders consisted of only a handful of regular troops and gunners, plus a mass of thousands of volunteers. They had, however, been able to inflict heavy casualties on the French at the barricades in the narrow winding streets.

Since September 1808, Colonel Sangenís had been working on a number of modern fortifications. To the south, the city was protected by the Huerva River, which Sangenís used as a moat with two redoubts on the south side of the river: "Our lady of the Pillar" in the south-west corner and the San Jose convent on the south-east corner. These were overlooked by the city walls.

To the west, a solid rampart had been built outside the city walls, incorporating the Augustinian and Trinitarian convents. This provided a central gun battery, as well as a ditch that was 14-metres deep.

San Lazaro was fortified with a rampart protected by waterways and the two convents on the north side of the Ebro River had been made into fortresses.

On the key position of Monte Torrero, Sangenís built an entrenched military camp using the Aragon Canal as a moat.

Progress on the fortifications had been slow until the Battle of Tudela. After that, it was clear the French could attack at any moment and suddenly 60,000 volunteers were available. If the French had attacked quickly, then even this would not have helped. Due to the delay, however, the Spanish had time to improve the fortifications and obtain sufficient supplies.

Inside the walls, the strong, almost entirely inflammable masonry homes and apartment buildings were laced together with internal passageways, making each block of the city its own barricaded fortress, with the numerous church buildings standing as keeps and strong-points, from which grapeshot and counter-battery fire could command the streets.

The garrison would also be much stronger than in the first siege. Palafox had raised an additional 10–12,000 new recruits in Saragossa plus a further 17,000 survivors of the Battle of Tudela. By the start of the siege Palafox had 32,000 infantry, 2,000 cavalry and 10,000 armed volunteers.

To prevent the danger of magazine explosions, the city manufactured its gunpowder as it was needed.

Supplies of Food and ammunition were sufficient for three months plus private stocks held by townspeople.

The delay
The Battle of Tudela was over on 23 November 1808 but the siege of Saragossa did not commence until 20 December 1808. This allowed the Spanish sufficient time to build up the defences and to lay in supplies.

After the Battle of Tudela two corps had been available to attack Saragossa – the 3rd corps under Marshal Moncey and the 6th Corps under Marshal Ney. Both of these corps left Tudela on 28 November and arrived at Saragossa on 30 November. They were about to commence the siege when Marshall Ney was ordered to take his army across the mountains to New Castille where he was to prevent the army of Castaños, retreating from Tudela, from interfering with his movements towards Madrid.

There were now only 15,000 men under Moncey facing Saragossa which was insufficient for a siege. As a result, Moncey retired to Tudela to await reinforcements from Marshal Mortier with his 5th Corps. These troops arrived from Germany on 15 December giving a total of 38,000 infantry, 3,500 cavalry, 3,000 engineers, and 60 siege guns to attack Saragossa.

The siege
On 20 December the French forces arrived again at Zaragoza. Moncey split his forces: One division under General Gazan was assigned to the north, Mortier's corps was posted to the west, and Moncey's corps went to the south.

Phase 1: The outworks 20 December 1808 – 15 January 1809
The first key objective was the weak Spanish outworks on Monte Torrero. On 21 December 1808, three batteries began bombarding these positions followed by an attack by twenty battalions of infantry which successfully drove the Spanish out of these positions. This initial success was to prove decisive as once again the French were able to deploy their main gun batteries on Monte Torrero and were ultimately successful in breaching the southern wall.

Gazan launched an attack on the same day against San Lazaro, however, this attack was unsuccessful due to the strength of the Spanish defence.

On 22 December 1808 Moncey formally demanded the surrender of the city but this was refused. Moncey then decided to concentrate his efforts on the southern side of the city and prepared attacks against the Pillar redoubt and against the San Jose convent. Preparations were also made for an attack opposite the castle of Aljafería in the north-west.

On 29 December 1808 Moncey was reassigned to Madrid and was replaced in command of the 3rd corps by General Jean-Andoche Junot. Mortier was then the senior officer however he worked in partnership with Junot until he was himself reassigned on 2 January 1809.

The French preparations were finally complete on 10 January 1809 and they commenced bombarding the Pillar Redoubt and San Jose. By the end of the day, the San Jose walls were about to collapse. Palafox counter-attacked the French guns at 1 am on 11 January 1808 but this attack failed and the Spanish troops withdrew into the city.

The French attack on the Pillar Redoubt continued until the night of 15–16 January 1808 when the 1st Polish Vistula Regiment stormed the position. The Spanish had already left destroying the bridge across the Huerva river at the same time.

Phase 2: Attacking the walls, 16–27 January 1809
On 16 January 1809 the main Spanish outworks were in French hands. The French armies could now concentrate on breaching the walls of Saragossa.

From 17 January 1809 the French began a bombardment of the walls from the San Jose redoubt. Palafox knew the walls would not last long and prepared barricades in the city, turning it into a maze of small forts.

In January Junot was replaced with Marshall Lannes who had been recovering from an earlier injury. Sickness was now creating problems on both sides. On the French side there were now only 20,000 fit infantry. At the same time new Spanish forces were being created near the city under Francisco Palafox (younger brother of the General) and the Marquis of Lazan (older brother of the General).

Lannes was concerned about his rear and recalled Mortier's division which had been protecting the lines of communication between Madrid and Saragossa. On 26 January Mortier's army defeated a peasant militia of some 4–5,000 men at Alcañiz.

The French attack commenced on 24 January 1809 when three beachheads were captured across the Huerva river. The main assault began on 27 January 1809 through three breaches in the city walls. Lannes broke through two breaches and captured the battery at the south-eastern corner and also the convent of Santa Engracia in the south-west.

This marked the end of this phase of the siege with the final phase of vicious street fighting to follow.

Phase 3: Street fighting 28 January – 20 February 1809
The Spanish defenders had been preparing for street fighting from the beginning. Lannes, however, had decided on a slow block-by-block siege of each individual fortification in order to minimise French casualties.

Individual battles were remarkable for their ferocity. At one point in the San Augustin Convent, the French held the altar end of the chapel and exchanged shots for hours on end with the Spanish entrenched in the nave and the belfry. However, French superiority in equipment and training took its toll, and thousands were falling daily both in the fighting and to disease, which was rampant throughout the city.

By February illness was decimating the population of Saragossa and only 8,495 men remained of the original garrison of 32,000 men. There were 10,000 dead and 13,737 sick or wounded.

The French were unaware of this however and morale was low due to the apparent never-ending battle in the narrow streets. Disappointed with the slow progress, Lannes ordered the troops north of the river to make a second attack on San Lazaro and on the 18th of February 1809 this attack was successful. The northern part of Saragossa could now be attacked with artillery.

By 19 February 1809 the Spanish defence was failing and Palafox himself was seriously ill. He sent his aide to Lannes to discuss terms of surrender. He then resigned his military command in favour of General St. March, and his civil command of the city to a 33-member council of local citizens.

The first offer of surrender was rejected and fighting resumed on 20 February 1809 but the civilian council quickly negotiated to end the fighting which ceased that evening.

Most of the city lay in ruins, and around 54,000 people had perished in the siege.

Aftermath
The Spanish campaign in early 1809 proceeded with the Battle of Uclés.

Under the terms of surrender the garrison marched out of the city and stacked their arms outside the Portillo gate. They had the choice of going into captivity or joining the French army. Of the 32,000 men at the start of the siege only 8,000 survived.

The terms of surrender allowed private property to be respected and a general amnesty was granted to the city. Although some looting took place the city was not sacked.

The suffering of the city had been terrible with estimated deaths of 54,000 made up of 20,000 soldiers and 34,000 civilians. Lannes himself estimated that the population of Saragossa had fallen from 55,500 to 15,000. The city considered the Florence of Spain was completely destroyed, losing many emblematic buildings like Abbey of Santa Engracia or the houses of the kingdom, the government headquarters of the medieval era.

The French had also suffered losing about 10,000 men – 4,000 in battle and the rest to sickness.

Palafox himself was harshly treated by the French who imprisoned him as a traitor at Vincennes.

Notes

References

Further reading
The Spanish Ulcer, A History of the Peninsular War, Dr. David Gates. 2002, Pimlico, 592 pages, English,

An excellent single volume history of the Peninsular War, which when it was published was the first really good English language history of the entire war since Oman. This is a well balanced work with detailed coverage of those campaigns conducted entirely by Spanish armies, as well as the better known British intervention in Portugal and Spain.

A History of the Peninsular War vol. 2: Jan.–Sept. 1809 – From the Battle of Corunna to the end of the Talavera Campaign, Sir Charles Oman, New Edition 2004, Greenhill Books, 720 pages, English, 

Part two of Oman's classic history falls into two broad sections. The first half of the book looks at the period between the British evacuation from Corunna and the arrival of Wellesley in Portugal for the second time, five months when the Spanish fought alone, while the second half looks at Wellesley's campaign in the north of Portugal and his first campaign in Spain. One of the classic works of military history.

External links
 Los Sitios de Zaragoza (Spanish) at asociacionlossitios.com
Battles in Spain During 1809  at georgianindex.net
Second Siege of Saragossa at historyofwar.org
 

Sieges of the Peninsular War
Sieges involving France
Sieges involving Spain
Conflicts in 1809
1809 in Spain
December 1808 events
January 1809 events
February 1809 events
History of Zaragoza
Battles inscribed on the Arc de Triomphe